Wilkasy  is a village in the administrative district of Gmina Wieliczki, within Olecko County, Warmian-Masurian Voivodeship, in northern Poland.

The village has a population of 190.

References

Wilkasy